Michael Lyons RSA FRSS (10 July 1943 – 19 April 2019) was a British sculptor who was instrumental in the creation of the Yorkshire Sculpture Park.

Education
Lyons was educated at Cotton College, Staffordshire, at Wolverhampton College of Art (1959–1963), Hornsey College of Art (1963–1964) and Newcastle University (1964–1967).

Career
Lyons was Head of Sculpture at the Manchester Metropolitan University between 1989 and 1993 and also taught at college in the US, China, and Canada. He represented Britain in Biennales in China, Argentina, Mexico and Australia. His drawings and sculptures are in various collections, including those of the Canary Wharf Group, Arts Council England, the Henry Moore Institute, and the Yale Centre for British Art.

In 2011, three sculptures, 'Mayflower', 'Energy Of The Mountain: Echo And Revelation' and 'Energy Of The Mountain' were stolen from Lyons' studio and were never recovered.

He was a Trustee of the Ironbridge Open Air Museum of Steel Sculpture.

Exhibitions
Lyons has exhibited at various galleries, shows, and venues including:
New School House Gallery: 'Half-light' (19 June 2015–15 August 2015).
Leeds Art Gallery. 'Michael Lyons: Freeze Frame' (9 March 2016– 26 July 2016).
One Canada Square Scale Appropriate on loan (31 March 2014– 23 May 2014).
Yorkshire Sculpture Park. 
Macay Museo de Arte Contemporaneo.
York Art Gallery / York Museum Gardens Michael Lyons: Ancient and Modern (25 May 2019–May 2020).

Awards
In 1966, he featured in the Young Contemporaries in London and won a Peter Stuyvesant Prize at the 1967 Northern Young Contemporaries in Manchester. In 2006 he won the Premio Fondo Nacional de las Artes at Chaco Biennale, Argentina.

In 1994 he was elected as a Fellow of the Royal Society of Arts and as a Fellow of the Royal Society of Sculptors. He had also served as vice-president of the RSS from 1994–1997.  Lyons was also an Honorary member of the Manchester Academy of Fine Arts.

Gallery

Personal life 
Lyons grew up in the Black Country, and the area's post-war industrial landscape had a life-long influence on his work, as did his strong Catholic upbringing and, in later life, his interest in mythology and cosmology. In 1970 he married Stephanie Kay, whom he had met while they were students in the Department of Fine Art at Newcastle University and together they had a son David born in 1975 and daughter Anna in 1978. In 1977 he moved to Cawood, near York where he established a studio.

Legacy
In Lyon's Obituary in the Yorkshire Post, Peter Murray wrote: “His drawings often portrayed a sensitive response to landscape which had a strong influence on his powerful sculptures, which looked at home in the landscape.”

In an obituary in the Guardian he was described as: "...one of the group of artists who developed successful careers from a non-metropolitan base. Such strength of mind was the driving force that Michael and others, principally Peter Murray, engaged to create the Yorkshire Sculpture Park in 1977...so many young artists rushed off to London, and lost immediate connection with land and sky. It is this vision that Michael instinctively wound into his sculpture, while Yorkshire also gave him “the freedom to cut metal and smoke cigars”"

References

Further reading
Michael Lyons by Peter Murray, David Sweet, Michael Lyons, [exhibition catalogue], Yorkshire Sculpture Park (1998)
Close encounters of the three-dimensional kind: an experiential biography of Michael Lyons by Judith LeGrove, Green Bronze IV (1980), unpublished (winner of the 2010 Henry Moore Institute MA essay prize)
Scale Appropriate by Ann Elliott, catalogue essay for exhibition at Canary Wharf (2014)
The Sculpture of Michael Lyons by Judith LeGrove, Sansom & Co, (30 May 2013) (Hardback, 2013) 
Natural causes: the sculpture of Michael Lyons by David Sweet, Sculpture Journal, 22.2 (2013)
Michael Lyons: from Bilston to Beijing by Judith LeGrove, SculpturesPacific, 11 (2015)
Half-Light Michael Lyons and Judith LeGrove, (catalogue for exhibition at New School House Gallery, York, 2015)
The Sculpture of Michael Lyons by Judith LeGrove by James Hamilton, [book review], Sculpture Journal Vol. 24.1 (2015)
Freeze Frame catalogue edited by Dr .Judith LeGrove. Includes three essays: ‘Freeze Frame’ by Dr.Judith LeGrove; ‘Drawn to Sculpture: Michael Lyons’ ‘Lenten Cover’ (1979)’ by Michael Howard; and ‘Michael Lyons: Natural and Industrial ca 1963 -70’ by Dr.Julia Kelley (2016)
Future Now -100 Contemporary Artists from the Aesthetical Art Prize, published in association with Aesthetica Magazine (2016)
Machines, Myths and Murder by William Varley  review of ‘Machines and Myths’ in ‘The Jackdaw'(2018) 
David Sweet on Michael Lyons: Machines and Myths, Exhibition Review (2018)

External links
Lyons describes a trip to see Brancusi's 'Endless Column' in Romania (Henry Moore Institute)
Michael Lyons at York Art Gallery

2019 deaths
1943 births
British sculptors
People from Bilston
Alumni of Newcastle University